Ming Erh Chang (April 20, 1932 – October 3, 2017) served in the U.S. Navy for 34 years, becoming the first naturalized Asian American naval officer to reach flag rank in the United States military. He became the Department of the Navy Inspector General in 1987 after holding cruiser and destroyer commands. When Chang left the navy, he became vice president and corporate director for the Pacific region at Raytheon International and then president of MEC International, LLC.

Chang held degrees from the College of William & Mary, the Naval Postgraduate School, and the Industrial College of the Armed Forces.

Career
In  1980, Ming Chang became  the  first naturalized  Asian  American  naval  officer  to reach  flag rank.  A  graduate  of William and Mary  and the  Naval  Postgraduate School.  He  served as the  Commanding Officer  of  the  USS RATHBURNE REEVES,  USS; Chief of  Staff,  Carrier  Group  THREE; Chief of  Staff, Commander  THIRD Fleet;  and Commander Cruiser  Destroyer  Group  TWO.   As  a  Rear  Admiral,  he served as Deputy  Commander,  Weapons and Combat  Systems, Naval  Sea  Systems               Command.

Awards and recognition
Norman Mineta recounted: "And this isn't a question of being politically correct. it's a question of decency. I mean, why is it that we are considered foreign? It just blows my mind. I remember when Admiral Ming Chang got a call from a reporter one day, and he was recounting that the reporter asked him if he was a U.S. citizen. He says, Yes he was. 'Were you born here?' 'No, I came to the United States in 1950 [sic] (actually 1946) as a young boy from Shanghai.' 'And so, what did you do to get your citizenship?' 'And he says, 'I was naturalized.' 'What proof do you have of your citizenship?' 'He says, 'Well, young man, I served for 33 years in the United States Navy and came out a Rear Admiral, and I am now a very high ranking officer of the Raytheon International Corporation.'"

In 2010, Admiral Chang accepted an award from the Asian Pacific American Institute for Congressional Studies. He died on October 3, 2017 from complications of Parkinson's disease. Admiral Chang was interred at Arlington National Cemetery on March 7, 2018.

See also
Military history of Asian Americans

References

1932 births
2017 deaths
Republic of China (1912–1949) emigrants to the United States
Naturalized citizens of the United States
College of William & Mary alumni
American military personnel of Chinese descent
Naval Postgraduate School alumni
Dwight D. Eisenhower School for National Security and Resource Strategy alumni
Recipients of the Legion of Merit
Generals from Shanghai
United States Navy admirals
United States Navy Inspectors General
Burials at Arlington National Cemetery